The Fannin County Courthouse, built in 1937, is an historic courthouse building located in Blue Ridge, Georgia, United States. It was designed  by Atlanta-based architect William Augustus Edwards who designed one other courthouse in Georgia, two in Florida and  nine in South Carolina  well as academic buildings at 12 institutions in Florida, Georgia and South Carolina. On June 8, 1995, it was added to the National Register of Historic Places.

In 2004 it was replaced by a new courthouse built next door. It is now leased as Georgia Mountain Center for the Arts.

See also
National Register of Historic Places listings in Fannin County, Georgia

References

External links 
 National Register listings for Fannin County
 University of Florida biography of William Augustus Edwards
 

Courthouses on the National Register of Historic Places in Georgia (U.S. state)
Buildings and structures in Fannin County, Georgia
Former county courthouses in Georgia (U.S. state)
William Augustus Edwards buildings
National Register of Historic Places in Fannin County, Georgia